Mary Hobson is an American curler.

At the national level, she is a United States women's champion curler (1988).

Teams

References

External links 

 National Champions | Granite Curling Club of Seattle
 
 

Living people
American female curlers
American curling champions
Year of birth missing (living people)
Place of birth missing (living people)